Marshallena neozelanica is a species of sea snail, a marine gastropod mollusk in the family Marshallenidae.

Description
The length of the fusiform shell varies between 18 mm and 25 mm.

Distribution
This marine species was found as a fossil off Ninety Mile Beach, North Island, New Zealand but live specimens can still be found in the Indo-Pacific at mid-shelf to bathyal habitats

References

 Suter, Henry. Descriptions of New Tertiary Mollusca Occurring in New Zealand Part I. 1917.
 Maxwell, P.A. (2009). Cenozoic Mollusca. Pp 232–254 in Gordon, D.P. (ed.) New Zealand inventory of biodiversity. Volume one. Kingdom Animalia: Radiata, Lophotrochozoa, Deuterostomia. Canterbury University Press, Christchurch.

External links
 H. Suter (1915), Alphabetical hand-list of New Zealand Tertiary Mollusca; Wellington, N.Z. :John Mackay, govt. printer,1915
 Finlay, H. J., South Canterbury Basin, and R. S. By. "Notes on recent papers dealing with the Mollusca of New Zealand." Transactions of the New Zealand Institute. Vol. 61. 1930
 Cernohorsky, Walter O. "Taxonomic notes on some deep-water Turridae (Mollusca: Gastropoda) from the Malagasy Republic." Records of the Auckland Institute and Museum (1987): 123–134
 "A.G. Beu and J.I. Raine (2009). Revised descriptions of New Zealand Cenozoic Mollusca from Beu and Maxwell (1990). GNS Science miscellaneous series no. 27." 

neozelanica
Gastropods described in 1917